Abdallah ibn Ubaydallah ibn al-Abbas al-Hashimi was a ninth century Abbasid personage and governor of the Yemen.

Career 
A minor member of the Abbasid dynasty, being a second cousin of the caliphs al-Hadi (r. 785–786) and Harun al-Rashid (r. 789–809), Abdallah was appointed governor of the Yemen by al-Ma'mun (r. 813–833), and he arrived in Sana'a in ca. 832. He remained governor until the death of al-Ma'mun in 833, at which point he decided to place Abbad ibn al-Ghamr al-Shihabi in charge of the province and departed for Iraq.

Abdallah was also a frequent leader of the pilgrimage, having led the annual events of 828, 829, 831, and possibly 832.

Notes

References 
 
 
 
 
 

9th-century people from the Abbasid Caliphate
9th-century Arabs
Abbasid governors of Yemen
Abbasids
9th century in Yemen